The Pocono Organics CBD 325 was a NASCAR Cup Series stock car race held annually at Pocono Raceway in Long Pond, Pennsylvania. The race was the first of two NASCAR Cup Series races at Pocono Raceway, with the other being the Pocono 350, held the next day. First held as a  race during the 1982 season, it served as a replacement for the  race at Texas World Speedway. Starting in 2012, the race distance was reduced to 400 miles.

In 2020, the race became a doubleheader, with the Pocono Organics 325 being a Saturday afternoon race and the Pocono 350 on Sunday afternoon, and be held on the last weekend in June. The Truck event that is usually held in July and the first Cup race that is usually held in early June was run on Saturday. On Sunday, the Xfinity race that is run in June and the second Cup race followed.
When NASCAR announced the schedule on September 15 Pocono lost one of its dates in favor of a race at World Wide Technology Raceway.

Alex Bowman is the last race winner.

Past winners

Notes
2000 and 2016: Race postponed from Sunday to Monday due to rain
2005 and 2010: Race was extended due to a NASCAR overtime finish
2007: Race was shortened due to rain and darkness

Multiple winners (drivers)

Multiple winners (teams)

Manufacturer wins

Notable races
1982: Dale Earnhardt flipped over Tim Richmond going into turn one and suffered a neck injury that he hid until the end of the season. Because of a 1984 Busch Clash crash involving Ricky Rudd where he hid his injuries, NASCAR changed the rules later that season mandating medical clearance from NASCAR officials before racing.
1987: Tim Richmond, making his return to racing after missing almost half the season due to what was initially reported as "double pneumonia" (later revealed to be AIDS; which ultimately claimed Richmond's life in 1989), finished the race with his penultimate career victory, despite suffering a broken gearbox that left him with only fourth gear.
1988: Bobby Allison reported a flat tire before the race, tried to complete a lap, but he did not. Driving into the tunnel turn, Allison blew the tire and slammed the outside wall. Then, Jocko Maggiacomo T-boned Allison in the driver's side door and Allison suffered career-ending injuries.
1998: Jeremy Mayfield finally won his first Cup race in an event that was interrupted by rain, but managed to go the distance. Mayfield's idol Darrell Waltrip was leading with less than 20 laps left driving for the injured Steve Park in his car owned by Dale Earnhardt. Jeremy wound up passing his idol for the race win a few laps later.
2000: Mayfield drew cheers and some boos as he booted Dale Earnhardt out of the way in the final corner in a resurgence year for the Intimidator.
2009: Tony Stewart became the first owner-driver to win since Ricky Rudd at Martinsville in 1998. It was also the first race in NASCAR history to introduce double-file restarts.
2010: On the Long Pond straightaway, Kasey Kahne spun across the track on the last lap and went airborne, collecting Greg Biffle, Mark Martin, Martin Truex Jr., Ryan Newman and others. Denny Hamlin won the race, which had been delayed for several hours due to rain.
2012: Twenty-two-year-old Joey Logano muscled his way past his mentor, 53-year-old Mark Martin, to score his second win (first in a race that was not truncated), on a newly repaved Pocono Raceway, snapping a 104-race winless streak. Logano started on the pole with a new track record, led 49 of the 160 laps, and won by about a second.
2014: Brad Keselowski dominated the race, leading 95 of 160 laps, but Earnhardt Jr. passed him with four laps to go to take the victory when Keselowski tried to use the lapped car of Danica Patrick to clean trash from his grille. 
2015: Martin Truex Jr. dominated the race, leading 97 of 160 laps en route to his victory. The race was aired on Fox Sports Television for the first time on FS1 after eight years on TNT.
2017: Ryan Blaney won his first Monster Energy NASCAR Cup Series race after passing Kyle Busch with 10 laps to go and holding off Kevin Harvick for the final nine laps of the race.
2019: Kyle Busch ties Rusty Wallace for 7th on the all-time wins list with his 55th-career win.
2020: After four runner-up finishes in his career at Pocono, Kevin Harvick finally won for the first time after holding off Denny Hamlin in the first Cup race of the doubleheader.
2021: Kyle Larson battled his teammate Alex Bowman in the closing laps, finally getting around him with four to go. Larson was on his way to his 4th win in a row (a feat that had not been accomplished since 2007), until cutting a left-front tire in Turn 3 and hitting the wall on the final lap. Bowman scooted past to steal the win over Kyle Busch. Larson was able to limp the car back to a ninth-place finish, and Bowman extended Hendrick Motorsports' streak of consecutive wins to six. On September 15, 2021 NASCAR released their 2022 Cup schedule, which sees Pocono lose one of its dates to Gateway. This is the event that the track will lose, therefore it was the last running of the event.

References

External links

1982 establishments in Pennsylvania
 
NASCAR Cup Series races
Recurring sporting events established in 1982
Annual sporting events in the United States